The Dawson–Lambton Trough is an undersea trough extending from the Dawson-Lambton Glacier terminus. The name, proposed by Heinrich Hinze of the Alfred Wegener Institute for Polar and Marine Research, Bremerhaven, Germany, was approved by the Advisory Committee for Undersea Features in June 1997.

References
 

Oceanic basins of the Southern Ocean